Bodhi Uwland is an Australian rules footballer who plays for the Gold Coast Football Club in the Australian Football League.

Early life
Uwland was born and raised on the Gold Coast where he attended All Saints Anglican School throughout his younger years. He began playing junior football for the Burleigh Bombers in the Gold Coast under-6s competition and later switched clubs to play senior football for the Broadbeach Cats in the top tier QAFL state league. Uwland joined the Gold Coast Suns' academy program as a teenager and was drafted to his hometown team with the 37th pick in the 2021 rookie draft. Uwland has stated he was a lifelong fan of the Gold Coast Suns prior to being drafted.

AFL career
Uwland made his AFL debut at 19 years of age against the Sydney Swans at Carrara Stadium in  round 1 of the 2023 AFL season.

References

External links

2003 births
Living people
Sportspeople from the Gold Coast, Queensland
Australian rules footballers from Queensland
Gold Coast Football Club players